Bulonga is a genus of moths in the family Geometridae described by Walker in 1859.

Species
 Bulonga distans Warren, 1896
 Bulonga griseosericea (Pagenstecher, 1889)
 Bulonga phillipsi Prout, 1930
 Bulonga schistacearia Walker, 1859
 Bulonga trilineata Bastelberger, 1905

References

Baptini